Sealion 2000 is a vehicular ferry operated by Kangaroo Island SeaLink on the 18 kilometre Cape Jervis to Penneshaw route across Backstairs Passage along with the Spirit of Kangaroo Island. These two ferries provide the main form of transport to Kangaroo Island operating up to 10 trips daily. This vessel is specifically made for passengers and cars and is a larger boat. Unlike the Spirit of Kangaroo Island which is a freight boat, used for transporting trucks as well as passengers.

It was built in 1998 by Tenix, Fremantle. In 2013 it returned to Fremantle for an overhaul that included its engines being replaced.

References

Ferries of South Australia
Kangaroo Island
1998 ships
Backstairs Passage